Sheet or Sheets may refer to:

 Bed sheet, a rectangular piece of cloth used as bedding
 Sheet of paper, a flat, very thin piece of paper
 Sheet metal, a flat thin piece of metal
 Sheet (sailing), a line, cable or chain used to control the clew of a sail

Places
 Sheet, Hampshire, a village and civil parish in East Hampshire, Hampshire, England.
 Sheet, Shropshire, a village in Ludford, Shropshire, England.
 Sheets Lake, Michigan, United States.
 Sheets Site, a prehistoric archaeological site in Fulton County, Illinois, United States.
 Sheets Peak, a mountain in the Wisconsin Range, Antarctica.

Other uses
 Sheets (surname), a surname (including a list of people with the name)
 Sheet (computing), a type of dialog box 
 "Sheets", a 2003 song by Stephen Malkmus and the Jicks from Pig Lib 
 Google Sheets, spreadsheet editor by Google
 Sheet of stamps, a unit of stamps as printed
 Sheet or plate glass, a type of glass
 Ice sheet, a mass of glacier ice
 Sheet, the playing surface in the sport of curling

See also
 Sheet music (disambiguation)
 Sheetal (disambiguation), a given name
 Sheetz, a convenience store and gasoline station